This is a list of people executed in the United States in 2008. Thirty-seven people were executed in the United States in 2008. Eighteen of them were in the state of Texas. One (James Earl Reed) was executed via electrocution. Executions were not carried out in the United States between September 2007 and April 2008, due to certiorari in Baze v. Rees, which questioned the constitutionality of lethal injection. The U.S. Supreme Court stayed all executions for seven months until a decision was made, meaning executions did not begin until May, with none having taken place since that of Michael Wayne Richard the previous September.

List of people executed in the United States in 2008

Demographics

Executions in recent years

See also
 List of death row inmates in the United States
 List of most recent executions by jurisdiction
 List of people scheduled to be executed in the United States
 List of women executed in the United States since 1976

References

List of people executed in the United States
executed
People executed in the United States
2008